"Ghost of a Texas Ladies' Man" is a song from American alternative rock band Concrete Blonde, which was released in 1992 as the lead single from their fourth studio album Walking in London. The song was written by Johnette Napolitano, and produced by Concrete Blonde and Chris Tsangarides. It reached number 2 on the US Billboard Modern Rock Tracks chart in March 1992.

Background
Napolitano was inspired to write "Ghost of a Texas Ladies' Man" after a supernatural experience she had during an overnight stay at the Driskill Hotel in Austin, Texas, in March 1991, while the band were on tour as the opening act for Sting. Napolitano revealed to the Detroit Free Press in 1992, "There's this horny ghost there that goes for women. 'I wanna see you naked,' that was the vibe. The minute I took my clothes off, I felt like there was someone watching me." She added to the Austin American-Statesman, 

After her experience, Napolitano felt "inspired to write something funny". Describing its creation as a "refreshing experience", she told the Austin American-Statesman, "I've never written a song like that before. I just really liked the ectoplasm and everything. I was cracking up the entire time I wrote it. It was really funny."

Music video
The song's music video was directed by Jane Simpson and produced by Joan Weidman, Simpson and Tina Silvey for Silvey + Co. The video received its premiere on MTV on February 16, and would go on to achieve active rotation on the channel.

Critical reception
On its release, The Hard Report described "Ghost of a Texas Ladies' Man" as "a rhythm driven 'lil devil", with "witty, intelligent lyrics" and a "semi-campy arrangement". They noted Mankey's "'Ghost Riders in the Sky' style guitar" as being "quite the attention getter" and added that Napolitano has "never been in better voice". Dave Sholin of The Gavin Report wrote, "A far cry from their biggest hit, 'Joey,' but then again, of the many things one might say to describe Concrete Blonde, 'predictable' is not one of them."

Jordan Zivitz of the Montreal Gazette commented, "The song is far better than most of the rubbish on radio nowadays, but Concrete Blonde has set such high expectations for themselves that this new track is disappointing. Although tinges of black humor have laced many of their past songs, Concrete Blonde laced it on a bit thick this time." In his top ten list of single releases for the first half of 1992, Robert Hilburn of the Los Angeles Times picked the song as number seven and commented, "Combines the authority and gallop of the Pretenders with the mysterious but arty currents of film director Wim Wenders."

In a review of Walking in London, Parry Gettelman of The Orlando Sentinel described the song as "a cowboy-ghost-story-romance set to cattle-drive rhythms". He added, "Mankey turns into the Ennio Morricone of the guitar [and] Napolitano's delivery is full-throttle, but she strikes a note of wry detachment, half-speaking humorous lines. The production is widescreen, with a swelling chorus of 'oh-oh-ohs' worthy of a spaghetti western soundtrack." Barbara Jaeger of The Record commented, "The jaunty tune, with its spaghetti western feel fueled by Napolitano's dusky vocals [is] unlike anything the trio has done before."

Formats

Personnel
Credits are adapted from the US CD single liner notes and the Walking in London CD album booklet.

"Ghost of a Texas Ladies' Man"
 Johnette Napolitano – vocals, bass
 James Mankey – guitars
 Harry Rushakoff – drums, percussion

Production
 Concrete Blonde, Chris Tsangarides – producers on "Ghost of a Texas Ladies' Man" and "Bloodletting (The Vampire Song)"
 Chris Marshall – recording assistant on "Ghost of a Texas Ladies' Man"
 Earle Mankey – mixing on "Ghost of a Texas Ladies' Man"
 John Jackson – assistant mixer on "Ghost of a Texas Ladies' Man"
 John Golden – mastering on "Ghost of a Texas Ladies' Man"
 Concrete Blonde, Earle Mankey – remixers on extended version of "Bloodletting (The Vampire Song)"
 Dennis Herring – producer on "Everybody Knows"
 Concrete Blonde – producers on "The Ship Song"
 Sean Freehill – recording on "The Ship Song"

Other
 Ann E. Sperling – photography

Charts

References

1992 songs
1992 singles
Concrete Blonde songs
Songs written by Johnette Napolitano
I.R.S. Records singles